Panayur Shiva Temple  is located at Vaniyamkulam village in Palakkad district, in Kerala, India. The presiding deity of the temple is Shiva, located in main Sanctum Sanctorum, facing East. According to folklore, sage Parashurama has installed the idol. It is the part of the 108 Shiva Temples of Kerala. The temple is located around 4 km away from Vaniyamkulam village on the route of Vaniyamkulam - Vallappuzha Road. The main sanctum santorium is in square shape in kukkudakruthi styled.

See also
 108 Shiva Temples
 Temples of Kerala

References

108 Shiva Temples
Shiva temples in Kerala
Hindu temples in Palakkad district